Marian Măciucă better known as Maci (born 31 December 1981) is a Romanian beach soccer player. He is known for his acrobatic finishes such as volleys, over-head kicks and bicycle kicks as well as his extravagant goal celebrations.

Maci competed in the 2011 Mundialito de Clubes with Lokomotiv Moscow, finishing fourth and scoring six goals.

Honours

National team
 Romania
Euro Beach Soccer League Superfinal fourth place: 2011, 2012
Euro Beach Soccer League Superfinal sixth place: 2010
Euro Beach Soccer League Italian Event runner-up: 2011
Euro Beach Soccer League German Event runner-up: 2012
Euro Beach Soccer League German Event third place: 2011
Euro Beach Soccer League Dutch Event third place: 2010
Euro Beach Soccer League Russian Event third place: 2010

Club
 Lokomotiv Moscow
Mundialito de Clubes fourth place: 2011

Individual
 Romania
Euro Beach Soccer League Italian Event MVP: 2011
 Lokomotiv Moscow
Mundialito de Clubes sixth best scorer: 2011

References

External links
Biography

Sportspeople from Constanța
1981 births
Living people
Romanian beach soccer players
Romanian expatriates in Israel
Romanian expatriates in Russia
European Games competitors for Romania
Beach soccer players at the 2019 European Games